Emmanuel Vermignon (born 20 January 1989 in Fort-de-France, Martinique) is a professional footballer who plays as a goalkeeper for Club Colonial in the Martinique Championnat National and internationally for Martinique.

He made his debut for Martinique in 2010. He was in the Martinique Gold Cup squads for the 2013 and 2017  tournaments.

References

1989 births
Living people
Martiniquais footballers
 Martinique international footballers
Association football goalkeepers
Sportspeople from Fort-de-France